Fire Beacon Hill is a Local Nature Reserve in East Devon, England. It is registered as Common land and known as Harpford Common. Sidmouth Town Council are the current owners, and are responsible for the management of the site.

Geology 
The site is part of the East Devon dissected plateau, composed of calcareous upper greensand capped by clay, Flints and chert, and overlying Keuper marls.

The north part of the site is 225 metres above sea level and the ground slopes steeply to the south down to 150 metres.

Ecological features 

The site contains

 Lowland heath a rare biodiversity action plan habitat
 Wet woodland also a rare BAP habitat
 Ling Calluna vulgaris - the most common species of heather. 4 Corolla (flower petals) and Calyx unlike Erica which are bell shaped
 Bell heather Erica cinerea - leaves in whorls of 3
 Cross leaved heath Erica tetralix - leaves in whorls of 4
 European gorse
 Western gorse Ulex gallii - Lower growing and more spreading than European Gorse
 Bristle bent Agrostis curtisii - fine leaves, grows in tufts
 Purple moor grass Molinia caerulea - a BAP habitat species
 Bracken Pteridium aquilinum - threatens to dominate the areas where it is found
 Common bluebell
 Sheep sorrell Rumex acetosella
 Bramble Rubus fruticosus
 Foxglove Digitalis purpurea
 Some recolonising by heath bedstraw Galium saxatile, bilberry Vaccinium myrtillus, tormentil Pontentilla erecta, and heath milkwort Polygala serpyllifolia
 Alder, beech, birch, holly Ilex aquifolium, hazel Corylus avellana, oak Quercus robur, willow
 Grayling (butterfly)
 Yellowhammer
 Dartford warbler - as a Mediterranean bird, it can be found in the heather and gorse as these offer relatively warm microclimates for them.
 European stonechat - can be found on the tops of bushes.
 Common raven
 Linnet - favours low down thorny bushes and scrub, with good supply of small-sized seed
 Eurasian bullfinch-nests in tall hedges more than 4 metres high and wide, and prefers fruit seed
 European nightjar - nests on the ground and is well camouflaged.  Waving a white handkerchief is said to attract them.
 Common buzzard
 Adder Vipera berus- mates mid-May and gives birth between July and October
 Common lizard Lacerta vivipara
 Fox Vulpes vulpes, badger Meles meles, roe deer Capreolus capreolus
 Deer grass Muhlenbergia rigens

Historical 

 Fire Beacon Hill was the site of one of the beacons set up to warn Elizabethan London of the approaching Spanish Armada
 It was part of open heathland that once stretched from Honiton to Sidmouth.  The rest of the land was taken for conifer plantations.  The site is now seen by environmental organisations as a potential seed bank and species reservoir for future heathland restoration and re-creation projects.
 An apple tree can be found on the southern side.  Fruit trees were used as landmarks as far back as Saxon times.
 Fire Beacon Hill was described in the Journals of the Reverend John Swete, who travelled through it on horseback in 1795.  He describes for example a hedgerow of beech, which is now a remnant in the form of a few trees.
 In June 1993 a balloon crashed into a power line above the site.  The resulting intense fire sterilised the soil.

Public recreation and access 

The site is open to the public and is used for recreation and education.  Being on top of a hill near the Jurassic coast (one of the World Heritage Sites), the fine views give the site a high aesthetic appeal.

The East Devon Way footpath runs from north to south across the site.

References

External links
 East Devon Council Local Nature Reserves
 Audio Guide Description and map of the site
 Description by Offwell Woodland & Wildlife Trust

Local Nature Reserves in Devon